This is a list of the Permanent Representatives of the Republic of Liberia to the United Nations. The current office holder is Marjon Kamara, since 8 October 2009.

List

See also
Foreign relations of Liberia

References

Liberia